Jana Feldkamp (born 15 March 1998) is a German footballer who plays as a midfielder for 1899 Hoffenheim and the Germany national team.

Career

Clubs 
She started playing football in 2004 at her hometown club STV Hünxe, from which she moved to Essen in 2011. Feldkamp played for SGS Essen in the B-Junior Bundesliga from 2013 to 2015 and was promoted to Essen's first division squad in the second half of the 2014/15 season. There she made her debut on February 22, 2015 in an away game at FF USV Jena as a substitute. A week later, she scored her first Bundesliga goal in a 2-0 win against Herforder SV.

In April 2021 she announced she joined TSG 1899 Hoffenheim and signed there until 2023.

In July 2017 Feldkamp was awarded the Fritz Walter Medal by the DFB as the best junior player.

National Team 
Feldkamp debuted on April 17, 2013 in the German U-15 national team and was later also a regular player in the U-16 and U-17 age groups. Feldkamp took part in the 2016 European Championships in Slovakia for the U-19s and played in all 3 games. With the U-20 selection, she took part in the 2016 World Cup in Papua New Guinea and the 2018 World Cup in France, where Germany reached the quarter-finals. Feldkamp made her international debut for the senior German team on 10 April 2021, starting in the friendly match against Australia. The home match finished as a 5–2 win for Germany.

Career statistics

International

Honours
SGS Essen
DFB-Pokal Frauen runner-up: 2019–20

Individual
Fritz Walter Medal, Gold: 2017

References

External links
 Commons : Jana Feldkamp - Collection of images, videos, and audio files
 
 
 
 
 Jana Feldkamp in the worldfootball.net database
 Jana Feldkamp in the soccerdonna.de database
 Jana Feldkamp in the FuPa.net database

1998 births
Living people
People from Wesel (district)
Sportspeople from Düsseldorf (region)
Footballers from North Rhine-Westphalia
German women's footballers
Germany women's youth international footballers
Germany women's international footballers
Women's association football midfielders
TSG 1899 Hoffenheim (women) players
Frauen-Bundesliga players

SGS Essen players
Association football midfielders